Rapolas Okulič-Kazarinas (Okulič-Kozarinas) (24 October 1857 – 27 April 1919) was a Major general, a volunteer of the Lithuanian Army, one of the pioneers of the Lithuanian military aviation.

Biography 
In 1873, Okulič-Kazarinas began military service in the third infantry regiment of the Imperial Russian Army's 28th Infantry Division. Soon he was sent to be educated in the infantry junkers school in Riga for two years. After finishing it in 1875, he returned to his regiment. In 1878, he was promoted to lieutenant and was made commander of his company. He was promoted to Stabs-kapitan in 1888.

In 1902, he studied at the officer jäger school, he was promoted to the rank of lieutenant colonel. During 1903–1904, he was chairman of the regimental court. In 1905, he was appointed as the regiment's commander and sent to Manchuria with the regiment. In 1906, he was transferred to the 3rd Don Infantry Regiment and was appointed commander of its 4th Battalion. In 1911, he was made colonel. In 1912, he was promoted to Major General and released to reserve.

Activity in Lithuania 
On 29 March 1919, he joined the Lithuanian army as a volunteer. As an officer, he was appointed overseer of the bomb warehouse.

After his death, R. Okulič-Kazarinas was awarded the Volunteer and the Lithuanian independence medals in 1930 and 1931 respectively.

Bibliography 

 Biography of Rapolas Okulič-Kazarinas
 
 

1857 births
1919 deaths
Lithuanian Army officers